Harold Gould (30 July 1914 – 11 September 2000) was a Welsh professional golfer. He won the Welsh Professional Championship six times between 1946 and 1963 and twice represented Wales in the Canada Cup.

Golf career
Gould finished tied for second place in the 1949 PGA Assistants' Championship, five shots behind the winner, Harry Weetman and tied with Peter Alliss.

Gould was an assistant professional at Radyr Golf Club before World War II, moving to Royal Porthcawl Golf Club after the war and to Southerndown Golf Club in 1950.

Gould played in the 1954 Canada Cup with Dai Rees and the 1955 Canada Cup with Dennis Smalldon. In 1954 Gould scored 316 for his four rounds, 34 shots worse than Rees. The following year he improved, scoring 299, three strokes behind his partner Smalldon.

Gould won his sixth Welsh Professional Championship in June 1963 at the age of 48.

Tournament wins
1946 Welsh Professional Championship
1948 Welsh Professional Championship
1949 Welsh Professional Championship
1951 Welsh Professional Championship
1954 Welsh Professional Championship
1963 Welsh Professional Championship

Results in major championships

Note: Gould only played in The Open Championship.

CUT = missed the half-way cut
"T" indicates a tie for a place

Team appearances
Canada Cup (representing Wales): 1954, 1955

References

Welsh male golfers
Sportspeople from Bridgend
1914 births
2000 deaths